The 1980 UK Athletics Championships was the national championship in outdoor track and field for the United Kingdom held at Crystal Palace Athletics Stadium, London. Three events were contested separately at Meadowbank Stadium, Edinburgh – the women's 1500 metres and men's 800 metres and 5000 metres. This set of events served as the British Olympic Team Trials for the 1980 Summer Olympics. Two new events were contested for the first time: a men's 10,000 metres track walk and a women's 5000 metres track walk.

It was the fourth edition of the competition limited to British athletes only, launched as an alternative to the AAA Championships, which was open to foreign competitors. However, due to the fact that the calibre of national competition remained greater at the AAA event, the UK Championships this year were not considered the principal national championship event by some statisticians, such as the National Union of Track Statisticians (NUTS). Many of the athletes below also competed at the 1980 AAA Championships.

Women's discus thrower Meg Ritchie took a record fourth consecutive UK title. David Ottley won a third straight title in the javelin throw. Five other athletes defended their 1979 titles: Gary Oakes in the 400 metres hurdles, Heather Hunte in the women's 100 m, Christina Boxer in the women's 800 m, Shirley Strong in the women's 100 metres hurdles and Angela Littlewood in the women's shot put. Two athletes achieved a championship double: Cameron Sharp edged out Drew McMaster in both the men's 100 metres and 200 metres, and David Moorcroft claimed a 1500/5000 m double.

At the 1980 Moscow Olympics, one participant at the UK trials won an individual medal – hurdles champion Gary Oakes took Olympic bronze. The four women who took the top three in the short sprints (Hunte, Kathy Smallwood, Beverley Goddard, and Sonia Lannaman) combined to win an Olympic bronze in the 4 × 100 metres relay, and the top three in the women's 400 metres (Linsey Macdonald, Joslyn Hoyte-Smith and Michelle Probert) joined Donna Hartley to take the 4 × 400 metres relay Olympic bronze. Allan Wells, Sebastian Coe, Steve Ovett and Daley Thompson made the 1980 Olympic podium, but were not present at this national event.

Medal summary

Men

Women

References

UK Athletics Championships
UK Outdoor Championships
Athletics Outdoor
Sports competitions in Edinburgh
Sports competitions in London
Athletics competitions in England
UK Athletics Championships